Howard Edmund Dea (April 9, 1891 – February 9, 1966) was a Canadian professional ice hockey player. He played with the Calgary Tigers and Edmonton Eskimos of the Western Canada Hockey League. Billy Dea, uncle of James Wisniewski, is his son.

References

External links

1891 births
1966 deaths
Calgary Tigers players
Edmonton Eskimos (ice hockey) players
Ice hockey people from Ontario
People from Midland, Ontario
Canadian ice hockey centres